This is a list of episodes from the Disney Junior (also Disney Channel and Family Jr.) series Henry Hugglemonster.

Series overview

Episodes

Season 1 (2013–14)

Season 2 (2014–15)

References

Lists of American children's animated television series episodes